Viktor Yuryevich Borisov (born 12 April 1985) is a Russian former professional footballer.

Club career
He made his debut in the Russian Premier League in 2006 for FC Tom Tomsk.

References

1985 births
Living people
Sportspeople from Volgograd
Russian footballers
Association football midfielders
FC Tom Tomsk players
FC Baltika Kaliningrad players
FC Salyut Belgorod players
FC Rotor Volgograd players
Russian Premier League players
FC Mordovia Saransk players
FC Olimpia Volgograd players
FC Zenit-Izhevsk players
FC Sever Murmansk players